Standings and results for Group 10 of the UEFA Euro 2004 qualifying tournament.

Group 10 consisted of Albania, Georgia, Republic of Ireland, Russia and Switzerland. Group winners were Switzerland, finishing one point ahead of Russia, who qualified for the play-offs.

Standings

Matches

Goalscorers

Notes

References

External links
UEFA.com
RSSSF Page

Group 10
2002 in Russian football
2003 in Russian football
2002–03 in Republic of Ireland association football
2003 in Republic of Ireland association football
2002–03 in Georgian football
2003–04 in Georgian football
2002–03 in Swiss football
2003–04 in Swiss football
2002–03 in Albanian football
2003–04 in Albanian football
Russia at UEFA Euro 2004
Switzerland at UEFA Euro 2004